The chromatic circle is a clock diagram for displaying relationships among the 12 equal-tempered pitch classes making up the familiar chromatic scale on a circle.

Explanation
If one starts on any equal-tempered pitch and repeatedly ascends by the musical interval of a semitone, one will eventually land on a pitch with the same pitch class as the initial one, having passed through all the other equal-tempered chromatic pitch classes in between. Since the space is circular, it is also possible to descend by semitone.  

The chromatic circle is useful because it represents melodic distance, which is often correlated with physical distance on musical instruments.  For instance, to move from any C on a piano keyboard to the nearest E, one must move up four semitones, corresponding to four clockwise steps on the chromatic circle.  One can also move down by eight semitones, corresponding to eight counterclockwise steps on the pitch class circle.  

Larger motions on the piano (or in pitch space) can be represented in pitch class space by paths that "wrap around" the chromatic circle one or more times.

One can represent the twelve equal-tempered pitch classes by the cyclic group of order twelve, or equivalently, the residue classes modulo twelve, Z/12Z.  The group  has four generators, which can be identified with the ascending and descending semitones and the ascending and descending perfect fifths.  
The semitonal generator gives rise to the chromatic circle while the perfect fifth gives rise to the circle of fifths.

Comparison with circle of fifths

A key difference between the chromatic circle and the circle of fifths is that the former is truly a continuous space: every point on the circle corresponds to a conceivable pitch class, and every conceivable pitch class corresponds to a point on the circle.  By contrast, the circle of fifths is fundamentally a discrete structure, and there is no obvious way to assign pitch classes to each of its points.

Pitch constellation

A pitch constellation is a graphical representation of pitches used to describe musical scales, modes, chords or other groupings of pitches within an octave range.  It consists of a circle with markings along the circumference or lines from the center which indicate pitches.  Most pitch constellations use of a subset of pitches chosen from the twelve pitch chromatic scale.  In this case the points on the circle are spaced like the twelve hour markings on an analog clock where each tick mark represents a semitone.

Scales and modes

The pitch constellation provides an easy way to identify certain patterns and similarities between harmonic structures.

For example.

 A major scale consists of a circle with markings at 0 (or 12), 2, 4, 5, 7, 9 and 11 o'clock.
 A minor scale consists of a circle with markings at 0 (or 12), 2, 3, 5, 7, 8 and 10 o'clock.

The diagrams above show the two scales marked with "scale degrees".  It can be observed that the tonic, second, fourth and fifth are shared, while the minor scale flattens the third, sixth and seventh notes relative to the major scale.  Another observation is that the minor scale's constellation is the same as the major scale, but rotated +90 degrees.

In the following drawing all of the major/minor scales are drawn.  Note that the constellation for all the major scales or all the minor scales are identical.  The different scales are generated by rotating the note overlay.  The notes that need to be sharpened/flattened can be easily identified.

Moreover, if we draw all seven diatonic modes we can see them all as rotations of the Ionian mode.  Note also the significance of the 6 o'clock point.  This corresponds to a tritone.  The modes including pitches a tritone from the tonic (Locrian and Lydian) are least used.  The 5 o'clock and 7 o'clock pitches are also important points corresponding to a perfect fourth and perfect fifth respectively.  The most used scales/modes - major (Ionian mode), minor (Aeolian mode) and Mixolydian - include these pitches.

Symmetric scales have simple representations in this scheme.

More exotic scales - such as the pentatonic, blues and octatonic - can also be drawn and related to the common scales.

A more complete list of musical scales and modes

Other overlays

In previous sections we saw how various overlays (scale degrees, semi-tone numbering, notes) can be used to notate the circumference of the constellation.  Various other overlays can be laid around the constellation.  For example:
 Intervals.
 Solfège.
 Pitch ratios (ratios of pitch frequencies).

Note that once a pitch constellation has been determined, any number of overlays (notes, solfège, intervals, etc.) may be placed on top for analysis/comparison.  Often generating one harmonic relationship from another is simply a matter of rotating the overlay or constellation or shifting one or two pitch locations.

Chords

Similarities between chords can also be observed as well as the significance of augmented/diminished notes.

For triads we have the following:

And for seventh chords:

Circle of fifths

Beginning with a pitch constellation of a chromatic scale, the notes of a circle of fifths can be easily generated.  Starting at C and moving across the circle and then one tick clockwise a line is drawn with an arrow indicating the direction moved.  Continuing from that point (across the circle and one tick clockwise) all points are connected.  Moving through this pattern the notes of the circle of fifths
can be determined (C, G, D, A ...).

One can also depict non-tempered intervals on a chromatic circle, which allows one to depict commas (small intervals), particularly comma pumps. For example, using a sequence of twelve just fifths (3:2 ratio) does not quite return to the starting point (the size of the gap is the Pythagorean comma), resulting in a "broken" circle of fifths.

Technical note

The ratio of the frequencies between two pitches in the constellation can be determined as follows.  Take the length of the arc (measured clockwise) between the two points and divide by the circumference of the circle.  The frequency ratio is two raised to this power.  For example, for a fifth (P5, which is located at 7 o'clock relative to the tonic T) the frequency ratio is:

References

Further reading
.

.

External links
 Notenscheibe web application - pitch constellations of scales, triads, intervals and the circle of fifths, with basic audio
 On-line app illustrating pitch constellations
 ScaleTapper - IPhone app which utilizes pitch constellations.
 PDF of musical scales

Pitch space
Post-tonal music theory